Calogero Rizzuto (born 5 January 1992) is a German professional footballer who plays as a right-back for 1. FC Saarbrücken.

Rizzuto is a former youth international for Germany at the U17 level.

References

External links
 
 

1992 births
Living people
Sportspeople from Saarbrücken
German footballers
Association football fullbacks
Germany youth international footballers
German sportspeople of Italian descent
1. FC Kaiserslautern II players
FC Erzgebirge Aue players
FC Hansa Rostock players
1. FC Saarbrücken players
2. Bundesliga players
3. Liga players
Footballers from Saarland